Meioceras nitidum is a species of minute sea snail, a marine gastropod mollusk or micromollusk in the family Caecidae.

Distribution

Description 
The maximum recorded shell length is 3.1 mm.

Habitat 
Minimum recorded depth is 0 m. Maximum recorded depth is 24 m.

References

External links

Caecidae
Gastropods described in 1851